Madem-G15, (officially the Movement for Democratic Alternation, Group of 15) is a political party in Guinea-Bissau founded by former members of PAIGC in 2018, named for the 15 members who left the PAIGC. Notably, it won 27, the second most seats, of 102 seats in the 2019 legislative election of Guinea-Bissau in its first election showing. On 28 February 2020, Umaro Sissoco Embalo, a member of Madem-G15, took office as President of Guinea-Bissau in a contested election. The party supports former President José Mário Vaz in his dispute with reformist Domingos Simões Pereira.

References

2018 establishments in Africa
Democratic socialist parties in Africa
Political parties established in 2018
Political parties in Guinea-Bissau
Socialism in Guinea-Bissau